A funeral is a ceremony connected with the final disposition of a corpse, such as a burial or cremation, with the attendant observances. Funerary customs comprise the complex of beliefs and practices used by a culture to remember and respect the dead, from interment, to various monuments, prayers, and rituals undertaken in their honor. Customs vary between cultures and religious groups. Funerals have both normative and legal components. Common secular motivations for funerals include mourning the deceased, celebrating their life, and offering support and sympathy to the bereaved; additionally, funerals may have religious aspects that are intended to help the soul of the deceased reach the afterlife, resurrection or reincarnation.

The funeral usually includes a ritual through which the corpse receives a final disposition. Depending on culture and religion, these can involve either the destruction of the body (for example, by cremation or sky burial) or its preservation (for example, by mummification or interment). Differing beliefs about cleanliness and the relationship between body and soul are reflected in funerary practices. A memorial service (or celebration of life) is a funerary ceremony that is performed without the remains of the deceased person.

The word funeral comes from the Latin funus, which had a variety of meanings, including the corpse and the funerary rites themselves. Funerary art is art produced in connection with burials, including many kinds of tombs, and objects specially made for burial like flowers with a corpse.

Overview

Funeral rites are as old as human culture itself, pre-dating modern Homo sapiens and dated to at least 300,000 years ago. For example, in the Shanidar Cave in Iraq, in Pontnewydd Cave in Wales and at other sites across Europe and the Near East, archaeologists have discovered Neanderthal skeletons with a characteristic layer of flower pollen. This deliberate burial and reverence given to the dead has been interpreted as suggesting that Neanderthals had religious beliefs, although the evidence is not unequivocal – while the dead were apparently buried deliberately, burrowing rodents could have introduced the flowers.

Substantial cross-cultural and historical research document funeral customs as a highly predictable, stable force in communities. Funeral customs tend to be characterized by five "anchors": significant symbols, gathered community, ritual action, cultural heritage, and transition of the dead body (corpse).

Religious funerals

Baháʼí Faith
Funerals in the Baháʼí Faith are characterized by not embalming, a prohibition against cremation, using a chrysolite or hardwood casket, wrapping the body in silk or cotton, burial not farther than an hour (including flights) from the place of death, and placing a ring on the deceased's finger stating, "I came forth from God, and return unto Him, detached from all save Him, holding fast to His Name, the Merciful, the Compassionate." The Baháʼí funeral service also contains the only prayer that's permitted to be read as a group – congregational prayer, although most of the prayer is read by one person in the gathering. The Baháʼí decedent often controls some aspects of the Baháʼí funeral service, since leaving a will and testament is a requirement for Baháʼís. Since there is no Baháʼí clergy, services are usually conducted under the guise, or with the assistance of, a Local Spiritual Assembly.

Buddhist

A Buddhist funeral marks the transition from one life to the next for the deceased. It also reminds the living of their own mortality. Cremation is the preferred choice,  although burial is also allowed. Buddhists in Tibet perform sky burials where the body is exposed to be eaten by vultures. The body is dissected with a blade on the mountain top before the exposure. Crying and wailing is discouraged and the rogyapas (Body breakers who perform the ritual) laugh as if they are doing farm work. Tibetan Buddhists believe that a light-hearted atmosphere during the funeral helps the soul of the dead to get a better afterlife. After the vultures consume all the flesh the rogpyas smash the bones into pieces and mix them tsampa to feed them to the vultures.

Christian

Congregations of varied denominations perform different funeral ceremonies, but most involve offering prayers, scripture reading from the Bible, a sermon, homily, or eulogy, and music. One issue of concern as the 21st century began was with the use of secular music at Christian funerals, a custom generally forbidden by the Catholic Church.

Christian burials have traditionally occurred on consecrated ground such as in churchyards. There are many funeral norms like in Christianity to follow. Burial, rather than a destructive process such as cremation, was the traditional practice amongst Christians, because of the belief in the resurrection of the body. Cremations later came into widespread use, although some denominations forbid them. The US Conference of Catholic Bishops said "The Church earnestly recommends that the pious custom of burying the bodies of the deceased be observed; nevertheless, the Church does not prohibit cremation unless it was chosen for reasons contrary to Christian doctrine" (canon 1176.3).

See also: Christian burial and Cremation in the Christian World

Hindu

Antyesti, literally "last rites or last sacrifice", refers to the rite-of-passage rituals associated with a funeral in Hinduism. It is sometimes referred to as Antima Samskaram, Antya-kriya, Anvarohanyya, or Vahni Sanskara.

A dead adult Hindu is cremated, while a dead child is typically buried. The rite of passage is said to be performed in harmony with the sacred premise that the microcosm of all living beings is a reflection of a macrocosm of the universe. The soul (Atman, Brahman) is believed to be the immortal essence that is released at the Antyeshti ritual, but both the body and the universe are vehicles and transitory in various schools of Hinduism. They consist of five elements: air, water, fire, earth and space. The last rite of passage returns the body to the five elements and origins. The roots of this belief are found in the Vedas, for example in the hymns of Rigveda in section 10.16, as follows,

The final rites of a burial, in case of untimely death of a child, is rooted in Rig Veda's section 10.18, where the hymns mourn the death of the child, praying to deity Mrityu to "neither harm our girls nor our boys", and pleads the earth to cover, protect the deceased child as a soft wool.

Among Hindus, the dead body is usually cremated within a day of death. The body is washed, wrapped in white cloth for a man or a widow, red for a married woman, the two toes tied together with a string, a Tilak (red mark) placed on the forehead. The dead adult's body is carried to the cremation ground near a river or water, by family and friends, and placed on a pyre with feet facing south. The eldest son, or a male mourner, or a priest then bathes before leading the cremation ceremonial function. He circumambulates the dry wood pyre with the body, says a eulogy or recites a hymn in some cases, places sesame seed in the dead person's mouth, sprinkles the body and the pyre with ghee (clarified butter), then draws three lines signifying Yama (deity of the dead), Kala (time, deity of cremation) and the dead. The pyre is then set ablaze, while the mourners mourn. The ash from the cremation is consecrated to the nearest river or sea. After the cremation, a period of mourning is observed for 10 to 12 days after which the immediate male relatives or the sons of the deceased shave their head, trim their nails, recites prayers with the help of priest or Brahmin and invite all relatives, kins, friends and neighbours to eat a simple meal together in remembrance of the deceased. This day, in some communities, also marks a day when the poor and needy are offered food in memory of the dead.

Zoroastrianism

The belief that bodies are infested by Nasu upon death greatly influenced Zoroastrian burial ceremonies and funeral rites. Burial and cremation of corpses was prohibited, as such acts would defile the sacred creations of earth and fire respectively (Vd. 7:25). Burial of corpses was so looked down upon that the exhumation of “buried corpses was regarded as meritorious.” For these reasons, “Towers of Silence” were developed—open air, amphitheater like structures in which corpses were placed so carrion-eating birds could feed on them.

Sagdīd, meaning “seen by a dog,” is a ritual that must be performed as promptly after death as possible. The dog is able to calculate the degree of evil within the corpse, and entraps the contamination so it may not spread further, expelling Nasu from the body (Denkard. 31). Nasu remains within the corpse until it has been seen by a dog, or until it has been consumed by a dog or a carrion-eating bird (Vd. 7:3). According to chapter 31 of the Denkard, the reasoning for the required consumption of corpses is that the evil influences of Nasu are contained within the corpse until, upon being digested, the body is changed from the form of nasa into nourishment for animals. The corpse is thereby delivered over to the animals, changing from the state of corrupted nasa to that of hixr, which is “dry dead matter,” considered to be less polluting.

A path through which a funeral procession has traveled must not be passed again, as Nasu haunts the area thereafter, until the proper rites of banishment are performed (Vd. 8:15). Nasu is expelled from the area only after “a yellow dog with four eyes,[b] or a white dog with yellow ears” is walked through the path three times (Vd. 8:16). If the dog goes unwillingly down the path, it must be walked back and forth up to nine times to ensure that Nasu has been driven off (Vd. 8:17-18).

Zoroastrian ritual exposure of the dead is first known of from the writings of the mid-5th century BCE Herodotus, who observed the custom amongst Iranian expatriates in Asia Minor. In Herodotus' account (Histories i.140), the rites are said to have been "secret", but were first performed after the body had been dragged around by a bird or dog. The corpse was then embalmed with wax and laid in a trench.[3]:204

While the discovery of ossuaries in both eastern and western Iran dating to the 5th and 4th centuries BCE indicates that bones were isolated, that this separation occurred through ritual exposure cannot be assumed: burial mounds, where the bodies were wrapped in wax, have also been discovered. The tombs of the Achaemenid emperors at Naqsh-e Rustam and Pasargadae likewise suggest non-exposure, at least until the bones could be collected. According to legend (incorporated by Ferdowsi into his Shahnameh), Zoroaster is himself interred in a tomb at Balkh (in present-day Afghanistan).

Writing on the culture of the Persians, Herodotus reports on the Persian burial customs performed by the Magi, which are kept secret. However, he writes that he knows they expose the body of male dead to dogs and birds of prey, then they cover the corpse in wax, and then it is buried. The Achaemenid custom is recorded for the dead in the regions of Bactria, Sogdia, and Hyrcania, but not in Western Iran.

The Byzantine historian Agathias has described the burial of the Sasanian general Mihr-Mihroe: "the attendants of Mermeroes took up his body and removed it to a place outside the city and laid it there as it was, alone and uncovered according to their traditional custom, as refuse for dogs and horrible carrion".

Towers are a much later invention and are first documented in the early 9th century CE.[1]:156–162 The ritual customs surrounding that practice appear to date to the Sassanid era (3rd – 7th century CE). They are known in detail from the supplement to the Shāyest nē Shāyest, the two Revayats collections, and the two Saddars.

Islamic

Funerals in Islam (called Janazah in Arabic) follow fairly specific rites. In all cases, however, sharia (Islamic religious law) calls for burial of the body, preceded by a simple ritual involving bathing and shrouding the body, followed by salat (prayer).

Burial rituals should normally take place as soon as possible and include:
 Bathing the dead body with water, camphor and leaves of ziziphus lotus, except in extraordinary circumstances as in battle.
 Enshrouding the dead body in a white cotton or linen cloth except extraordinary cases such as battle. In such cases apparel of corpse is not changed.
 Reciting the funeral prayer in all cases for a Muslim.
 Burial of the dead body in a grave in all cases for a Muslim.
 Positioning the deceased so that when the face or body is turned to the right side it faces Mecca.

Jewish

In Judaism, funerals follow fairly specific rites, though they are subject to variation in custom. Halakha calls for preparatory rituals involving bathing and shrouding the body accompanied by prayers and readings from the Hebrew Bible, and then a funeral service marked by eulogies and brief prayers, and then the lowering of the body into the grave and the filling of the grave. Traditional law and practice forbid cremation of the body; the Reform Jewish movement generally discourages cremation but does not outright forbid it.

Burial rites should normally take place as soon as possible and include:
 Bathing the dead body.
 Enshrouding the dead body. Men are shrouded with a kittel and then (outside the Land of Israel) with a tallit (shawl), while women are shrouded in a plain white cloth.
 Keeping watch over the dead body.
 Funeral service, including eulogies and brief prayers.
 Burial of the dead body in a grave.
 Filling of the grave, traditionally done by family members and other participants at the funeral.
 In many communities, the deceased is positioned so that the feet face the Temple Mount in Jerusalem (in anticipation that the deceased will be facing the reconstructed Third Temple when the messiah arrives and resurrects the dead).

Sikh

In Sikhism death is not considered a natural process, an event that has absolute certainty and only happens as a direct result of God's Will or Hukam. In Sikhism, birth and death are closely associated, as they are part of the cycle of human life of "coming and going" ( ਆਵਣੁ ਜਾਣਾ, Aana Jaana) which is seen as transient stage towards Liberation ( ਮੋਖੁ ਦੁਆਰੁ, Mokh Du-aar), which is understood as complete unity with God; Sikhs believe in reincarnation.

The soul itself is not subject to the cycle of birth and death; death is only the progression of the soul on its journey from God, through the created universe and back to God again. In life a Sikh is expected to constantly remember death so that he or she may be sufficiently prayerful, detached and righteous to break the cycle of birth and death and return to God.

The public display of grief by wailing or crying out loud at the funeral (called "Antam Sanskar") is discouraged and should be kept to a minimum. Cremation is the preferred method of disposal, burial and burial at sea are also allowed if by necessity or by the will of the person. Markers such as gravestones, monuments, etc. are not allowed, because the body is considered to be just the shell and the person's soul is their real self.

On the day of the cremation, the body is washed and dressed and then taken to the Gurdwara or home where hymns (Shabad's) from Sri Guru Granth Sahib Ji, the Sikh Scriptures are recited by the congregation. Kirtan may also be performed by Ragis while the relatives of the deceased recite "Waheguru" sitting near the coffin. This service normally takes from 30 to 60 minutes. At the conclusion of the service, an Ardas is said before the coffin is taken to the cremation site.

At the point of cremation, a few more Shabads may be sung and final speeches are made about the deceased person. The eldest son or a close relative generally lights the fire. This service usually lasts about 30 to 60 minutes. The ashes are later collected and disposed of by immersing them in a river and preferably in one of the five rivers in the state of Punjab, India.

The ceremony in which the Sidharan Paath is begun after the cremation ceremony, may be held when convenient, wherever the Sri Guru Granth Sahib Ji is present.

Hymns are sung from Sri Guru Granth Sahib Ji.
The first five and final verses of "Anand Sahib," the "Song of Bliss," are recited or sung.
The first five verses of Sikhism's morning prayer, "Japji Sahib", are read aloud to begin the Sidharan paath.
A hukam, or random verse, is read from Sri Guru Granth Sahib Ji.
Ardas, a prayer, is offered.
Prashad, a sacred sweet, is distributed.
Langar, a meal, is served to guests.
While the Sidharan paath is being read, the family may also sing hymns daily. Reading may take as long as needed to complete the paath.

This ceremony is followed by Sahaj Paath Bhog, Kirtan Sohila, night time prayer is recited for one week, and finally Ardas called the "Antim Ardas" ("Final Prayer") is offered the last week.

Celtic
It was custom for an officiant to walk in front of the coffin with a horse's skull, this tradition was still observed by Welsh peasants  up until the 19th century, which may be linked with the Mari Lwyd tradition.
In an article from 1874, it reads; "In the funerals of Welsh peasants it is common even now to carry a horse's skull in front of the coffin.".

Western funerals

Classical antiquity

Ancient Greece

The Greek word for funeral – kēdeía (κηδεία) – derives from the verb kēdomai (κήδομαι), that means attend to, take care of someone. Derivative words are also kēdemón (κηδεμών, "guardian") and kēdemonía (κηδεμονία, "guardianship"). From the Cycladic civilization in 3000 BCE until the Hypo-Mycenaean era in 1200–1100 BCE the main practice of burial is interment. The cremation of the dead that appears around the 11th century BCE constitutes a new practice of burial and is probably an influence from the East. Until the Christian era, when interment becomes again the only burial practice, both cremation and interment had been practiced depending on the area.

The ancient Greek funeral since the Homeric era included the próthesis (πρόθεσις), the ekphorá (ἐκφορά), the burial and the perídeipnon (περίδειπνον). In most cases, this process is followed faithfully in Greece until today.

Próthesis is the deposition of the body of the deceased on the funereal bed and the threnody of his relatives. Today the body is placed in the casket, that is always open in Greek funerals. This part takes place in the house where the deceased had lived. An important part of the Greek tradition is the epicedium, the mournful songs that are sung by the family of the deceased along with professional mourners (who are extinct in the modern era). The deceased was watched over by his beloved the entire night before the burial, an obligatory ritual in popular thought, which is maintained still.

Ekphorá is the process of transport of the mortal remains of the deceased from his residence to the church, nowadays, and afterward to the place of burial. The procession in the ancient times, according to the law, should have passed silently through the streets of the city. Usually certain favourite objects of the deceased were placed in the coffin in order to "go along with him." In certain regions, coins to pay Charon, who ferries the dead to the underworld, are also placed inside the casket. A last kiss is given to the beloved dead by the family before the coffin is closed.

The Roman orator Cicero describes the habit of planting flowers around the tomb as an effort to guarantee the repose of the deceased and the purification of the ground, a custom that is maintained until today. After the ceremony, the mourners return to the house of the deceased for the perídeipnon, the dinner after the burial. According to archaeological findings–traces of ash, bones of animals, shards of crockery, dishes and basins–the dinner during the classical era was also organized at the burial spot. Taking into consideration the written sources, however, the dinner could also be served in the houses.

The Necrodeipnon (Νεκρόδειπνον) was the funeral banquet which was given at the house of the nearest relative.

Two days after the burial, a ceremony called "the thirds" was held. Eight days after the burial the relatives and the friends of the deceased assembled at the burial spot, where "the ninths" would take place, a custom still kept. In addition to this, in the modern era, memorial services take place 40 days, 3 months, 6 months, 9 months, 1 year after the death and from then on every year on the anniversary of the death. The relatives of the deceased, for an unspecified length of time that depends on them, are in mourning, during which women wear black clothes and men a black armband.

Nekysia (Νεκύσια), meaning the day of the dead, and Genesia (Γενέσια), meaning the day of the forefathers (ancestors), were yearly feasts in honour of the dead.

Nemesia (Νεμέσια) or Nemeseia (Nεμέσεια) was also a yearly feast in honour of the dead, most probably intended for averting the anger of the dead.

Ancient Rome

In ancient Rome, the eldest surviving male of the household, the pater familias, was summoned to the death-bed, where he attempted to catch and inhale the last breath of the decedent.

Funerals of the socially prominent usually were undertaken by professional undertakers called libitinarii. No direct description has been passed down of Roman funeral rites. These rites usually included a public procession to the tomb or pyre where the body was to be cremated. The surviving relations bore masks bearing the images of the family's deceased ancestors. The right to carry the masks in public eventually was restricted to families prominent enough to have held curule magistracies. Mimes, dancers, and musicians hired by the undertakers, and professional female mourners, took part in these processions. Less well-to-do Romans could join benevolent funerary societies (collegia funeraticia) that undertook these rites on their behalf.

Nine days after the disposal of the body, by burial or cremation, a feast was given (cena novendialis) and a libation poured over the grave or the ashes. Since most Romans were cremated, the ashes typically were collected in an urn and placed in a niche in a collective tomb called a columbarium (literally, "dovecote"). During this nine-day period, the house was considered to be tainted, funesta, and was hung with Taxus baccata or Mediterranean Cypress branches to warn passersby. At the end of the period, the house was swept out to symbolically purge it of the taint of death.

Several Roman holidays commemorated a family's dead ancestors, including the Parentalia, held February 13 through 21, to honor the family's ancestors; and the Feast of the Lemures, held on May 9, 11, and 13, in which ghosts (larvae) were feared to be active, and the pater familias sought to appease them with offerings of beans.

The Romans prohibited cremation or inhumation within the sacred boundary of the city (pomerium), for both religious and civil reasons, so that the priests might not be contaminated by touching a dead body, and that houses would not be endangered by funeral fires.

Restrictions on the length, ostentation, expense of, and behaviour during funerals and mourning gradually were enacted by a variety of lawmakers. Often the pomp and length of rites could be politically or socially motivated to advertise or aggrandise a particular kin group in Roman society. This was seen as deleterious to society and conditions for grieving were set. For instance, under some laws, women were prohibited from loud wailing or lacerating their faces and limits were introduced for expenditure on tombs and burial clothes.

The Romans commonly built tombs for themselves during their lifetime. Hence these words frequently occur in ancient inscriptions, V.F. Vivus Facit, V.S.P. Vivus Sibi Posuit. The tombs of the rich usually were constructed of marble, the ground enclosed with walls, and planted around with trees. But common sepulchres usually were built below ground, and called hypogea. There were niches cut out of the walls, in which the urns were placed; these, from their resemblance to the niche of a pigeon-house, were called columbaria.

North American funerals
Within the United States and Canada, in most cultural groups and regions, the funeral rituals can be divided into three parts: visitation, funeral, and the burial service. A home funeral (services prepared and conducted by the family, with little or no involvement from professionals) is legal in nearly every part of North America, but in the 21st century, they are uncommon in the US.

Visitation
At the visitation (also called a "viewing", "wake" or "calling hours"), in Christian or secular Western custom, the body of the deceased person (or decedent) is placed on display in the casket (also called a coffin, however almost all body containers are caskets). The viewing often takes place on one or two evenings before the funeral. In the past, it was common practice to place the casket in the decedent's home or that of a relative for viewing. This practice continues in many areas of Ireland and Scotland. The body is traditionally dressed in the decedent's best clothes. In recent times there has been more variation in what the decedent is dressed in – some people choose to be dressed in clothing more reflective of how they dressed in life. The body will often be adorned with common jewelry, such as watches, necklaces, brooches, etc. The jewelry may be taken off and given to the family of the deceased prior to burial or be buried with the deceased. Jewelry has to be removed before cremation in order to prevent damage to the crematory. The body may or may not be embalmed, depending upon such factors as the amount of time since the death has occurred, religious practices, or requirements of the place of burial.

The most commonly prescribed aspects of this gathering are that the attendees sign a book kept by the deceased's survivors to record who attended. In addition, a family may choose to display photographs taken of the deceased person during his/her life (often, formal portraits with other family members and candid pictures to show "happy times"), prized possessions and other items representing his/her hobbies and/or accomplishments. A more recent trend is to create a DVD with pictures and video of the deceased, accompanied by music, and play this DVD continuously during the visitation.

The viewing is either "open casket", in which the embalmed body of the deceased has been clothed and treated with cosmetics for display; or "closed casket", in which the coffin is closed. The coffin may be closed if the body was too badly damaged because of an accident or fire or other trauma, deformed from illness, if someone in the group is emotionally unable to cope with viewing the corpse, or if the deceased did not wish to be viewed. In cases such as these, a picture of the deceased, usually a formal photo, is placed atop the casket.

However, this step is foreign to Judaism; Jewish funerals are held soon after death (preferably within a day or two, unless more time is needed for relatives to come), and the corpse is never displayed. Torah law forbids embalming. Traditionally flowers (and music) are not sent to a grieving Jewish family as it is a reminder of the life that is now lost. The Jewish shiva tradition discourages family members from cooking, so food is brought by friends and neighbors. (See also Jewish bereavement.)

The decedent's closest friends and relatives who are unable to attend frequently send flowers to the viewing, with the exception of a Jewish funeral, where flowers would not be appropriate (donations are often given to a charity instead).

Obituaries sometimes contain a request that attendees do not send flowers (e.g. "In lieu of flowers"). The use of these phrases has been on the rise for the past century. In the US in 1927, only 6% of the obituaries included the directive, with only 2% of those mentioned charitable contributions instead. By the middle of the century, they had grown to 15%, with over 54% of those noting a charitable contribution as the preferred method of expressing sympathy.

Funeral

The deceased is usually transported from the funeral home to a church in a hearse, a specialized vehicle designed to carry casketed remains. The deceased is often transported in a procession (also called a funeral cortège), with the hearse, funeral service vehicles, and private automobiles traveling in a procession to the church or other location where the services will be held. In a number of jurisdictions, special laws cover funeral processions – such as requiring most other vehicles to give right-of-way to a funeral procession. Funeral service vehicles may be equipped with light bars and special flashers to increase their visibility on the roads. They may also all have their headlights on, to identify which vehicles are part of the cortege, although the practice also has roots in ancient Roman customs. After the funeral service, if the deceased is to be buried the funeral procession will proceed to a cemetery if not already there. If the deceased is to be cremated, the funeral procession may then proceed to the crematorium.

Funeral customs vary from country to country. In the United States, any type of noise other than quiet whispering or mourning is considered disrespectful. 

A burial tends to cost more than a cremation.

Burial service

At a religious burial service, conducted at the side of the grave, tomb, mausoleum or cremation, the body of the decedent is buried or cremated at the conclusion.

Sometimes, the burial service will immediately follow the funeral, in which case a funeral procession travels from the site of the funeral to the burial site. In some other cases, the burial service is the funeral, in which case the procession might travel from the cemetery office to the grave site. Other times, the burial service takes place at a later time, when the final resting place is ready, if the death occurred in the middle of winter.

If the decedent served in a branch of the Armed forces, military rites are often accorded at the burial service.

In many religious traditions, pallbearers, usually males who are relatives or friends of the decedent, will carry the casket from the chapel (of a funeral home or church) to the hearse, and from the hearse to the site of the burial service.

Most religions expect coffins to be kept closed during the burial ceremony. In Eastern Orthodox funerals, the coffins are reopened just before burial to allow mourners to look at the deceased one last time and give their final farewells. Greek funerals are an exception as the coffin is open during the whole procedure unless the state of the body does not allow it.

Morticians may ensure that all jewelry, including wristwatch, that were displayed at the wake are in the casket before it is buried or entombed. Custom requires that everything goes into the ground; however this is not true for Jewish services. Jewish tradition stipulates that nothing of value is buried with the deceased.

In the case of cremation such items are usually removed before the body goes into the furnace. Pacemakers are removed prior to cremation – if left in they could explode.

Memorial services

A memorial service is one given for the deceased, often without the body present. The service takes place after cremation or burial at sea, after donation of the body to an academic or research institution, or after the ashes have been scattered. It is also significant when the person is missing and presumed dead, or known to be deceased though the body is not recoverable. These services often take place at a funeral home; however, they can be held in a home, school, workplace, church or other location of some significance. A memorial service may include speeches (eulogies), prayers, poems, or songs to commemorate the deceased. Pictures of the deceased and flowers are usually placed where the coffin would normally be placed.

After the sudden deaths of important public officials, public memorial services have been held by communities, including those without any specific connection to the deceased. For examples, community memorial services were held after the assassinations of US presidents James A. Garfield and William McKinley.

European funerals

England
In England, funerals are commonly held at a church, crematorium or cemetery chapel. Historically, it was customary to bury the dead, but since the 1960s, cremation has been more common.

While there is no visitation ceremony like in North America, relatives may view the body beforehand at the funeral home. A room for viewing is usually called a chapel of rest. Funerals typically last about half an hour. They are sometimes split into two ceremonies: a main funeral and a shorter committal ceremony. In the latter, the coffin is either handed over to a crematorium or buried in a cemetery. This allows the funeral to be held at a place without cremation or burial facilities. Alternatively, the entire funeral may be held in the chapel of the crematorium or cemetery. It is not customary to view a cremation; instead, the coffin may be hidden with curtains towards the end of the funeral.

After the funeral, it is common for the mourners to gather for refreshments. This is sometimes called a wake, though this is different to how to the term is used in other countries, where a wake is a ceremony before the funeral.

Finland

In Finland, religious funerals (hautajaiset) are quite ascetic. The local priest or minister says prayers and blesses the deceased in their house. The mourners (saattoväki) traditionally bring food to the mourners' house. Nowadays the deceased is put into the coffin in the place where they died. The undertaker will pick up the coffin and place it in the hearse and drive it to the funeral home, while the closest relatives or friends of the deceased will follow the hearse in a funeral procession in their own cars. The coffin will be held at the funeral home until the day of the funeral. The funeral services may be divided into two parts. First is the church service (siunaustilaisuus) in a cemetery chapel or local church, then the burial.

Iceland

Italy
The majority of Italians are Roman Catholic and follow Catholic funeral traditions. Historically, mourners would walk in a funeral procession to the gravesite; today vehicles are used.

Greece

Poland

In Poland, in urban areas, there are usually two, or just one “stop”. The body, brought by a hearse from the mortuary, may be taken to a church or to a cemetery chapel. There is then a funeral mass or service at cemetery chapel. Following the mass or Service the casket is carried in procession (usually on foot) by hearse to the grave. Once at the grave-site, the priest will commence the graveside committal service and the casket is lowered. The mass or service usually takes place at the cemetery.

In some traditional rural areas, the wake (czuwanie) takes place in the house of the deceased or their relatives. The body lies in state for three days in the house. The funeral usually takes place on the third day. Family, neighbors and friends gather and pray during the day and night on those three days and nights. There are usually three stages in the funeral ceremony (ceremonia pogrzebowa, pogrzeb): the wake (czuwanie), then the body is carried by procession (usually on foot) or people drive in their own cars to the church or cemetery chapel for mass, and another procession by foot to the gravesite.

After the funeral, families gather for a post-funeral get-together (stypa). It can be at the family home, or at a function hall. In Poland cremation is less popular because the Catholic Church in Poland prefers traditional burials (though cremation is allowed). Cremation is more popular among non-religious people and Protestants in Poland.

Russia

Scotland
An old funeral rite from the Scottish Highlands involved burying the deceased with a wooden plate resting on his chest. On the plate were placed a small amount of earth and salt, to represent the future of the deceased. The earth hinted that the body would decay and become one with the earth, while the salt represented the soul, which does not decay. This rite was known as "earth laid upon a corpse". This practice was also carried out in Ireland, as well as in parts of England, particularly in Leicestershire, although in England the salt was intended to prevent air from distending the corpse.

Spain
In Spain, a burial or cremation may occur very soon after a death. Most Spaniards are Roman Catholics and follow Catholic funeral traditions. First, family and friends sit with the deceased during the wake until the burial. Wakes are a social event and a time to laugh and honor the dead. Following the wake comes the funeral mass (Tanatorio) at the church or cemetery chapel. Following the mass is the burial. The coffin is then moved from the church to the local cemetery, often with a procession of locals walking behind the hearse.

Wales
Traditionally, a good funeral (as they were called) had one draw the curtains for a period of time; at the wake, when new visitors arrived, they would enter from the front door and leave through the back door. The women stayed at home whilst the men attended the funeral, the village priest would then visit the family at their home to talk about the deceased and to console them.

The first child of William Price, a Welsh Neo-Druidic priest, died in 1884. Believing that it was wrong to bury a corpse, and thereby pollute the earth, Price decided to cremate his son's body, a practice which had been common in Celtic societies.
The police arrested him for the illegal disposal of a corpse. Price successfully argued in court that while the law did not state that cremation was legal, it also did not state that it was illegal. The case set a precedent that, together with the activities of the newly founded Cremation Society of Great Britain, led to the Cremation Act 1902. The Act imposed procedural requirements before a cremation could occur and restricted the practice to authorised places.

Other types of funerals

Celebration of life 
A growing number of families choose to hold a life celebration or celebration of life event for the deceased in addition to or instead of a traditional funeral. Unlike funerals, the focus of the ceremony is on the life that was lived. Such ceremonies may be held outside the funeral home or place of worship; restaurants, parks, pubs and sporting facilities are popular choices based on the specific interests of the deceased. Celebrations of life focus on a life that was lived, including the person's best qualities, interests, achievements and impact, rather than mourning a death. Some events are portrayed as joyous parties, instead of a traditional somber funeral. Taking on happy and hopeful tones, celebrations of life discourage wearing black and focus on the deceased's individuality. An extreme example might have "a fully stocked open bar, catered food, and even favors." Notable recent celebrations of life ceremonies include those for René Angélil and Maya Angelou.

Jazz funeral

Originating in New Orleans, Louisiana, U.S., alongside the emergence of jazz music in late 19th and early 20th centuries, the jazz funeral is a traditionally African-American burial ceremony and celebration of life unique to New Orleans that involves a parading funeral procession accompanied by a brass band playing somber hymns followed by upbeat jazz music. Traditional jazz funerals begin with a processional led by the funeral director, family, friends, and the brass band, i.e., the "main line", who march from the funeral service to the burial site while the band plays slow dirges and Christian hymns. After the body is buried, or "cut loose", the band begins to play up-tempo, joyful jazz numbers, as the main line parades through the streets and crowds of "second liners" join in and begin dancing and marching along, transforming the funeral into a street festival.

Green

The terms "green burial" and "natural burial", used interchangeably, apply to ceremonies that aim to return the body with the earth with little to no use of artificial, non-biodegradable materials. As a concept, the idea of uniting an individual with the natural world after they die appears as old as human death itself, being widespread before the rise of the funeral industry. Holding environmentally-friendly ceremonies as a modern concept first attracted widespread attention in the 1990s. In terms of North America, the opening of the first explicitly "green" burial cemetery in the U.S. took place in the state of South Carolina. However, the Green Burial Council, which came into being in 2005, has based its operations out of California. The institution works to officially certify burial practices for funeral homes and cemeteries, making sure that appropriate materials are used.

Religiously, some adherents of the Roman Catholic Church often have particular interest in "green" funerals given the faith's preference to full burial of the body as well as the theological commitments to care for the environment stated in Catholic social teaching.

Those with concerns about the effects on the environment of traditional burial or cremation may be placed into a natural bio-degradable green burial shroud. That, in turn, sometimes gets placed into a simple coffin made of cardboard or other easily biodegradable material. Furthermore, individuals may choose their final resting place to be in a specially designed park or woodland, sometimes known as an "ecocemetery", and may have a tree or other item of greenery planted over their grave both as a contribution to the environment and a symbol of remembrance.

Humanist and otherwise not religiously affiliated

Humanists UK organises a network of humanist funeral celebrants or officiants across England and Wales, Northern Ireland, and the Channel Islands and a similar network is organised by the Humanist Society Scotland. Humanist officiants are trained and experienced in devising and conducting suitable ceremonies for non-religious individuals. Humanist funerals recognise no "afterlife", but celebrate the life of the person who has died. In the twenty-first century, humanist funerals were held for well-known people including Claire Rayner, Keith Floyd, Linda Smith, and Ronnie Barker.

In areas outside of the United Kingdom, the Republic of Ireland has featured an increasing number of non-religious funeral arrangements according to publications such as Dublin Live. This has occurred in parallel with a trend of increasing numbers of people carefully scripting their own funerals before they die, writing the details of their own ceremonies. The Irish Association of Funeral Directors has reported that funerals without a religious focus occur mainly in more urbanized areas in contrast to rural territories. Notably, humanist funerals have started to become more prominent in other nations such as the Republic of Malta, in which civil rights activist and humanist Ramon Casha had a large scale event at the Radisson Blu Golden Sands resort devoted to laying him to rest. Although such non-religious ceremonies are "a rare scene in Maltese society" due to the large role of the Roman Catholic Church within that country's culture, according to Lovin Malta, "more and more Maltese people want to know about alternative forms of burial... without any religion being involved."

Actual events during non-religious funerals vary, but they frequently reflect upon the interests and personality of the deceased. For example, the humanist ceremony for the aforementioned Keith Floyd, a restaurateur and television personality, included a reading of Rudyard Kipling's poetic work If— and a performance by musician Bill Padley. Organizations such as the Irish Institute of Celebrants have stated that more and more regular individuals request training for administering funeral ceremonies, instead of leaving things to other individuals.

More recently, some commercial organisations offer "civil funerals" that can integrate traditionally religious content.

Police/fire services

Funerals specifically for fallen members of fire or police services are common in United States and Canada. These funerals involve honour guards from police forces and/or fire services from across the country and sometimes from overseas. A parade of officers often precedes or follows the hearse carrying the fallen comrade.A traditional fire department funeral consists of two raised aerial ladders. The firefighters travel under the aerials on their ride, on the fire apparatus, to the cemetery. Once there, the grave service includes the playing of bagpipes. The pipes have come to be a distinguishing feature of a fallen hero's funeral. Also a "Last Alarm Bell" is rung. A portable fire department bell is tolled at the conclusion of the ceremony.

Masonic
A Masonic funeral is held at the request of a departed Mason or family member. The service may be held in any of the usual places or a Lodge room with committal at graveside, or the complete service can be performed at any of the aforementioned places without a separate committal. Freemasonry does not require a Masonic funeral.

There is no single convention for a Masonic funeral service. Some Grand Lodges have a prescribed service (as it is a worldwide organisation). Some of the customs include the presiding officer wearing a hat while doing his part in the service, the Lodge members placing sprigs of evergreen on the casket, and a small white leather apron may being placed in or on the casket. The hat may be worn because it is Masonic custom (in some places in the world) for the presiding officer to have his head covered while officiating. To Masons the sprig of evergreen is a symbol of immortality. A Mason wears a white leather apron, called a "lambskin," on becoming a Mason, and he may continue to wear it even in death.

Asian funerals

In most East Asian, South Asian and many Southeast Asian cultures, the wearing of white is symbolic of death. In these societies, white or off-white robes are traditionally worn to symbolize that someone has died and can be seen worn among relatives of the deceased during a funeral ceremony. In Chinese culture, red is strictly forbidden as it is a traditionally symbolic color of happiness. Exceptions are sometimes made if the deceased has reached an advanced age such as 85, in which case the funeral is considered a celebration, where wearing white with some red is acceptable. Contemporary Western influence however has meant that dark-colored or black attire is now often also acceptable for mourners to wear (particularly for those outside the family). In such cases, mourners wearing dark colors at times may also wear a white or off-white armband or white robe.

Contemporary South Korean funerals typically mix western culture with traditional Korean culture, largely depending on socio-economic status, region, and religion. In almost all cases, all related males in the family wear woven armbands representing seniority and lineage in relation to the deceased, and must grieve next to the deceased for a period of three days before burying the body. During this period of time, it is customary for the males in the family to personally greet all who come to show respect. While burials have been preferred historically, recent trends show a dramatic increase in cremations due to shortages of proper burial sites and difficulties in maintaining a traditional grave. The ashes of the cremated corpse are commonly stored in columbaria.

In Japan

Most Japanese funerals are conducted with Buddhist and/or Shinto rites. Many ritually bestow a new name on the deceased; funerary names typically use obsolete or archaic kanji and words, to avoid the likelihood of the name being used in ordinary speech or writing. The new names are typically chosen by a Buddhist priest, after consulting the family of the deceased. 

Religious thought among the Japanese people is generally a blend of Shintō and Buddhist beliefs. In modern practice, specific rites concerning an individual's passage through life are generally ascribed to one of these two faiths. Funerals and follow-up memorial services fall under the purview of Buddhist ritual, and 90% Japanese funerals are conducted in a Buddhist manner. Aside from the religious aspect, a Japanese funeral usually includes a wake, the cremation of the deceased, and inclusion within the family grave. Follow-up services are then performed by a Buddhist priest on specific anniversaries after death.

According to an estimate in 2005, 99% of all deceased Japanese are cremated. In most cases the cremated remains are placed in an urn and then deposited in a family grave. In recent years however, alternative methods of disposal have become more popular, including scattering of the ashes, burial in outer space, and conversion of the cremated remains into a diamond that can be set in jewelry.

In the Philippines

Funeral practices and burial customs in the Philippines encompass a wide range of personal, cultural, and traditional beliefs and practices which Filipinos observe in relation to death, bereavement, and the proper honoring, interment, and remembrance of the dead. These practices have been vastly shaped by the variety of religions and cultures that entered the Philippines throughout its complex history.

Most if not all present-day Filipinos, like their ancestors, believe in some form of an afterlife and give considerable attention to honouring the dead. Except amongst Filipino Muslims (who are obliged to bury a corpse less than 24 hours after death), a wake is generally held from three days to a week. Wakes in rural areas are usually held in the home, while in urban settings the dead is typically displayed in a funeral home. Friends and neighbors bring food to the family, such as pancit noodles and bibingka cake; any leftovers are never taken home by guests, because of a superstition against it. Apart from spreading the news about someone's death verbally, obituaries are also published in newspapers. Although the majority of the Filipino people are Christians, they have retained some traditional indigenous beliefs concerning death.

In Korea

In Korea, funerals are typically held for three days and different things are done in each day.

The first day: on the day a person dies, the body is moved to a funeral hall. They prepare clothes for the body and put them into a chapel of rest. Then food is prepared for the deceased. It is made up of three bowls of rice and three kinds of Korean side dishes. Also, there has to be three coins and three straw shoes. This can be cancelled if the family of the dead person have a particular religion.

On the second day the funeral director washes the body and shrouding is done. Then, a family member of the dead person puts uncooked rice in the mouth of the body. This step does not have to be done if the family has a certain religion. After putting the rice in the mouth, the body is moved into a coffin. Family members, including close relatives, of the dead person will wear mourning clothing. Typically, mourning for a woman includes Korean traditional clothes, Hanbok, and mourning for man includes a suit. The color has to be black. The ritual ceremony begins when they are done with changing clothes and preparing foods for the dead person. The ritual ceremony is different depending on their religion. After the ritual ceremony family members will start to greet guests.

On the third day, the family decides whether to bury the body in the ground or cremate the body. In the case of burial, three family members sprinkle dirt on the coffin three times. In the case of cremation, there is no specific ritual; the only requirement is a jar to store burned bones and a place to keep the jar.

Other than these facts, in Korea, people who come to the funeral bring condolence money. Also, a food called Yukgaejang is served to guests, oftentimes with the Korean distilled drink called soju.

In Mongolia
In Mongolia, like many other cultures, funeral practices are the most important rituals that they follow. They have mixed their rituals with Buddhists due to creating a new, unique way of death.

For Mongolians who are very strict about tradition, families choose from three different ways of burial: open-air burial which is most common, cremation, and embalming. Many factors go into deciding which funeral practice to do. These consisted of the family's social standing, the cause of death, and the place of death. Embalming was mainly chosen by members of the Lamaistic Church; by choosing this practice, they are usually buried in a sitting position. This would show that they would always be in the position of prayer. Also, more important people such as nobles would be buried with weapons, horses and food in their coffins to help them prepare for the next world.

The coffin is designed and built by three to four relatives, mainly men. The builders bring planks to the hut where the dead is located and put together the box and the lid. The same people who build the coffin also decorate the funeral. Most of this work is done after dusk. With specific instruction, they work on decorations inside the youngest daughter's house. The reason for this is so the deceased is not disturbed at night.

In Vietnam
In Vietnam, Buddhism is the most commonly practiced religion, however, most burial methods do not coincide with the Buddhist belief of cremation.

The body of the deceased is moved to a loved one's house and placed in an expensive coffin. The body usually stays there for about three days, allowing time for people to visit and place gifts in the mouth. This stems from the Vietnamese belief that the dead should be surrounded by their family. This belief goes so far as to include superstition as well. If somebody is dying in Vietnamese culture, they are rushed home from the hospital so they can die there, because if they die away from home it is believed to be bad luck to take a corpse home.

Many services are also held in the Vietnamese burial practices. One is held before moving the coffin from the home and the other is held at the burial site. After the burial of the loved one, incense is burned at the gravesite and respect is paid to all the nearby graves. Following this, the family and friends return to the home and enjoy a feast to celebrate the life of the recently departed. Even after the deceased has been buried, the respect and honor continues. For the first 49 days after the burying, the family holds a memorial service every 7 days, where the family and friends come back together to celebrate the life of their loved one. After this, they meet again on the 100th day after the death, then 265 days after the death, and finally they meet on the anniversary of the death of their loved one, a whole year later, to continue to celebrate the glorious life of their recently departed.

The Vietnamese funeral, or dam gio, is a less somber occasion than most traditional Western funerals. The dam gio is a celebration of the deceased’s life and is centered around the deceased’s family.

Family members might wear a traditional garment called a mourning headband to signify their relationship with the deceased. Typical mourning headbands are thin strips of fabric that are wrapped around the wearer’s head. Traditionally, the deceased’s closest family members, such as children, siblings, spouses, and parents will wear white mourning headbands. More distant family members’ headband colors may vary. In some cultures, the deceased’s nieces, nephews, or grandchildren may be required to wear white headbands with red dots. Other societies may encourage grandchildren to wear white headbands with blue dots. Fourth generation grandchildren often wear yellow mourning headbands.

The use of mourning headbands emphasizes the importance of personal and familial roles in Vietnamese society. It also allows funeral attendants to carefully choose their interactions and offer condolences to those closest to the deceased.

Traditionally, attendants of a Vietnamese funeral service are encouraged to wear the color white. In many East Asian cultures, white is viewed as a sign of loss and mourning. In Vietnam, members of the Caodaist faith believe that white represents purity and the ability to communicate beyond spiritual worlds.

African funerals

Ancient Egypt

West African
African funerals are usually open to many visitors. The custom of burying the dead in the floor of dwelling-houses has been to some degree prevalent on the Gold Coast of Africa. The ceremony depends on the traditions of the ethnicity the deceased belonged to. The funeral may last for as much as a week. Another custom, a kind of memorial, frequently takes place seven years after the person's death. These funerals and especially the memorials may be extremely expensive for the family in question. Cattle, sheep, goats, and poultry, may be offered and then consumed.

The Ashanti and Akan ethnic groups in Ghana typically wear red and black during funerals. For special family members, there is typically a funeral celebration with singing and dancing to honor the life of the deceased. Afterwards, the Akan hold a sombre funeral procession and burial with intense displays of sorrow. Other funerals in Ghana are held with the deceased put in elaborate "fantasy coffins" colored and shaped after a certain object, such as a fish, crab, boat, and even airplanes. The Kane Kwei Carpentry Workshop in Teshie, named after Seth Kane Kwei who invented this new style of coffin, has become an international reference for this form of art.

Funeral practices of the Dagbamba

East African

Evidence of Africa's earliest funeral was found in Kenya in 2021. A 78,000 year old Middle Stone Age grave of a three-year-old child was discovered in Panga ya Saidi cave complex, Kenya. Researchers said the childs head appeared to have been laid on a pillow. The body had been laid in a fetal position.

In Kenya funerals are an expensive undertaking. Keeping bodies in morgues to allow for fund raising is a common occurrence more so in urban areas. Some families opt to bury their dead in the countryside homes instead of urban cemeteries, thus spending more money on transporting the dead.

Historical mausoleums

China

Mausoleum of the First Qin Emperor

The first emperor of the Qin dynasty, Qin Shi Huang’s mausoleum is located in the Lintong District of Xi’an, Shaanxi Province. Qin Shi Huang's tomb is one of the World Heritage sites in China. Its remarkable feature and size have been known as one of the most important historical sites in China. Qin Shi Huang is the first emperor who united China for the first time. The mausoleum was built in 247 BCE after he became the emperor of the Qin dynasty.

Ancient Chinese mausoleums have unique characteristics compared to other cultures. Ancient Chinese thought that the soul remains even after death, (immortal soul) regarded funeral practices as an important tradition. From their long history, the construction of mausoleums has developed over time, creating monumental and massive ancient emperor's tomb.

Archeologists have found more than 8,000 life-sized figures resembling an army surrounding the emperor's tomb. The primary purpose of the placement of Terracotta Army is to protect the emperor's tomb. The figures were composed of clay and fragments of pottery. The Terracotta Army resembles the soldiers, horses, government officials, and even musicians. All of the figures were made so acutely and delicately. The arrangement and the weapons they are carrying resembled entirely to the real weapons at that time. Furthermore, their facial features weren't identical, but with unique features and details.

Imperial Tombs of the Ming and Qing Dynasties

The Imperial Tombs of the Ming and Qing Dynasties are included as World Heritage Sites. The three Imperial Tombs of the Qin dynasty were additionally inscribed in 2000 and 2003. The three tombs were all built in the 17th century. The tombs have been constructed to praise the emperors of the Qing dynasty and their ancestors. In tradition, Chinese have followed the Feng Shui to build and decorate the interior. All of the tombs are strictly made followed by the Feng Shui theory. Harmony between the architecture and the surrounding topographical structure were seen as an integral part of nature. According to the Feng Shi theory, to build a tomb, there must be a mountain on the northern side and low land on the south. In the west and east, a river must be located.

The Imperial Tombs of the Ming and Qing Dynasties clearly shows the cultural and architectural tradition that has swayed the area for more than 500 years. There is a great harmony between the surrounding nature and the architecture. In Chinese culture, the tombs were considered as a portal between the world of the living and the dead. Chinese believed that the portal would divide the soul into two parts. The half of the soul would go to heaven, and the other half would remain within the physical body.

Mutes and professional mourners

From about 1600 to 1914 Europe had two professions that have almost entirely disappeared. The mute appears in art quite frequently, but in literature is probably best known from  Dickens's Oliver Twist (1837-1839). Oliver is working for Mr Sowerberry when characterised thus: "There's an expression of melancholy in his face, my dear... which is very interesting. He would make a delightful mute, my love". And in Martin Chuzzlewit (1842-1844), Moult, the undertaker, states: "This promises to be one of the most impressive funerals,...no limitation of expense...I have orders to put on my whole establishment of mutes, and mutes come very dear, Mr Pecksniff."

The main function of a funeral mute was to stand around at funerals with a sad, pathetic face. A symbolic protector of the deceased, the mute would usually stand near the door of the home or church. In Victorian times, mutes would wear somber clothing including black cloaks, top hats with trailing hatbands, and gloves.

The professional mourner, generally a woman, would shriek and wail (often while clawing her face and tearing at her clothing), to encourage others to weep. Records document forms of professional mourning from Ancient Greece, and practitioners were commonly employed throughout Europe until the beginning of the nineteenth century. The 2003 award-winning Philippine comedy Crying Ladies revolves around the lives of three women who are part-time professional mourners for the Chinese-Filipino community in Manila's Chinatown. According to the film, the Chinese use professional mourners to help expedite the entry of a deceased loved one's soul into heaven by giving the impression that he or she was a good and loving person, well-loved by many.

State funeral

High-ranking national figures such as heads of state, prominent politicians, military figures, national heroes and eminent cultural figures may be offered state funerals.

Final disposition

Common methods of disposal are:
 Burial of the entire body in the earth, often within a coffin or casket (also referred to as inhumation)
 Permanent storage in an above-ground tomb or mausoleum (also referred to as immurement)
 Cremation, which burns soft tissue and renders much of the skeleton to ash. The remains may contain larger pieces of bone which are ground in a machine to the consistency of ash. The ashes are commonly stored in an urn, or scattered on land or water.

Self-planned funerals

Some people choose to make their funeral arrangements in advance so that at the time of their death, their wishes are known to their family. However, the extent to which decisions regarding the disposition of a decedent's remains (including funeral arrangements) can be controlled by the decedent while still alive vary from one jurisdiction to another. In the United States, there are states which allow one to make these decisions for oneself if desired, for example by appointing an agent to carry out one's wishes; in other states, the law allows the decedent's next-of-kin to make the final decisions about the funeral without taking the wishes of the decedent into account.

The decedent may, in most U.S. jurisdictions, provide instructions as to the funeral by means of a last will and testament. These instructions can be given some legal effect if bequests are made contingent on the heirs carrying them out, with alternative gifts if they are not followed. This requires the will to become available in time; aspects of the disposition of the remains of US President Franklin Delano Roosevelt ran contrary to a number of his stated wishes, which were found in a safe that was not opened until after the funeral.

Organ donation and body donation
Some people donate their bodies to a medical school for use in research or education. Medical students frequently study anatomy from donated cadavers; they are also useful in forensic research. Some medical conditions, such as amputations or various surgeries can make the cadaver unsuitable for these purposes; in other cases the bodies of people who had certain medical conditions are useful for research into those conditions. Many medical schools rely on the donation of cadavers for the teaching of anatomy. It is also possible to arrange for donate organs and tissue after death for treating the sick, or even whole cadavers for forensic research at body farms.

See also
 Burial
 Dead bell
 Eulogy
 Funerary art
 Institute of Civil Funerals
 List of funerals
 Wake (ceremony)

References

Further reading
 Akyel, Dominic. From Detraditionalization to Price-consciousness: The Economization of Funeral Consumption in Germany. In Uwe Schimank and Ute Volkmann (ed.) The Marketization of Society: Economizing the Non-Economic. Bremen: Research Cluster “Welfare Societies”, 2012, pp. 105–124.
 Hoy, William G. (2013). Do Funerals Matter? The Purposes and Practices of Death Rituals in Global Perspective. New York: Routledge.
 
 Long, Thomas G. (2009). Accompany Them with Singing: The Christian Funeral. Louisville, KY: Westminster John Knox Press.

External links

 
 
Funeral Program Templates

Ceremonies
Funeral-related industry